A, B and C v Ireland is a landmark 2010 case of the European Court of Human Rights on the right to privacy under Article 8. The court rejected the argument that article 8 conferred a right to abortion, but found that Ireland had violated the European Convention on Human Rights by failing to provide an accessible and effective procedure by which a woman can have established whether she qualifies for a legal abortion under current Irish law.

Facts

Three anonymous women, recorded in the case as "A, B and C" travelled to the United Kingdom to have abortions, because abortions were unlawful in Ireland.

A
A, thinking her partner was infertile, had become pregnant unintentionally. She was unmarried, unemployed, living in poverty, with an alcohol addiction and had four children, all in foster care and one disabled. At risk of post-natal depression and feeling a fifth child would risk her progress in becoming sober, she borrowed €650 from a money lender at a high-interest rate to pay for travel and a private clinic in the UK, arriving secretly in the UK without telling her family or social workers or missing a contact visit with her children. On the returning train from Dublin she began bleeding profusely, was taken to hospital for a dilation and curettage and suffered pain, nausea and bleeding for weeks thereafter but did not seek further medical advice. After the claim was made to the ECHR, she became pregnant again and gave birth to a fifth child, while struggling with depression. However she regained custody of two of her children.

B
B became pregnant after her "morning-after pill" failed. Two different doctors advised there was a risk of an ectopic pregnancy, although she had found it was not. She borrowed a friend's credit card to book flights to the UK. To ensure her family would not find out, she listed nobody as her next of kin once in the UK and travelled alone. The clinic in the UK advised her to tell the Irish doctors she had had a miscarriage. Two weeks after returning to Ireland she began to start passing blood clots, and sought to follow-up care in a clinic in Dublin related to the English clinic, rather than attending an ordinary doctor because of her uncertainty of abortion's legality in Ireland.

C
C had been undergoing chemotherapy for cancer for three years. She had wanted children, but advice from doctors indicated that a foetus could be harmed during any ongoing chemotherapy. The cancer went into remission and she unintentionally became pregnant. While consulting her general practitioner on the impact of the pregnancy on her health and life and tests for cancer on the foetus, she alleged that she received insufficient information due to the chilling effect of the Irish legal framework. She researched the issues on the internet alone. Because she was unsure about the risks, she decided to go to the UK for an abortion. She could not find a clinic for a medical abortion, since she was a non-resident and the need for a follow-up, so she needed to wait a further eight weeks for a surgical abortion. The abortion was incompletely performed. She suffered prolonged bleeding and infection, and alleged the doctors provided inadequate medical care, and her general practitioner failed to refer to the fact after subsequent visits that she was no longer visibly pregnant.

Irish law
Article 40.3.3º of the Constitution of Ireland, as inserted by the Eighth Amendment in 1983, provided that "the State acknowledges the right to life of the unborn and, with due regard to the equal right to life of the mother, guarantees in its laws to respect, and, as far as practicable, by its laws to defend and vindicate that right". This was interpreted by the Supreme Court in the X Case (1992) as permitting abortion only where the continuation of a pregnancy would put a woman's life (not merely health or other interests) at risk. Attorney Julie F. Kay argued on behalf of three women identified as "A, B and C" that the restrictions violated their right to not be subject to degrading and humiliating treatment under article 3, their right to respect for their private lives under article 8, a right to an effective national remedy for these rights under article 13 and equal treatment in relation to Convention rights under article 14. C further alleged her right to life, given the danger resulting from prohibiting abortions, was violated under article 2. The Irish government chose to defend the case, its Attorney General Paul Gallagher, pointing out that Ireland's laws had been endorsed in three referendums. He requested the dismissal of the case because no domestic remedies had been sought by A, B or C and that there was no evidence that they interacted with verifiable legal or medical personnel or institutions in Ireland. The women were supported by a host of pro-choice charities, while various anti-abortion groups intervened to support Ireland.

Judgment
The Court held that "Article 8 cannot … be interpreted as conferring a right to abortion". It nevertheless considered that Ireland had violated article 8 with regard to the third applicant, C, because it was uncertain and unclear whether she could have access to abortion in a situation where she believed that her pregnancy was life-threatening. Rather than information being unavailable, the problem was that there was nowhere C could go to secure a legally authoritative determination of what her rights were in her situation. In this regard it noted the "significant chilling" effect of Irish legislation. All other complaints were dismissed. All of A, B and C's arguments that article 3 (right against inhuman and degrading treatment) as well as C's additional argument that article 2 (right to life) were violated were dismissed as "manifestly ill founded". The claims of A and B on the basis of article 8 were dismissed, because although it recognised the "serious impact of the impugned restriction on the first and second applicants" and that there was consensus 'amongst a substantial majority of the Contracting States' regarding the legality of abortion, the Court did "not consider that this consensus decisively narrows the broad margin of appreciation of the State." Thus Ireland had a broad margin of appreciation to maintain its existing laws where they were sufficiently clear. The Court did not consider it necessary to examine the applicants' complaints separately under Article 14 of the Convention.

Significance
Contrary to the hopes or fears of various campaign groups that the case might become a pan-European clone of the US Supreme Court's landmark ruling in the case Roe v Wade, the European Court of Human Rights emphasised there is no straightforward right to an abortion under the Convention, and that member states have a broad margin of appreciation to prohibit abortion. However, given the violation of applicant C's right to privacy, the result placed pressure on Ireland to further clarify whether and under which circumstances an abortion may be performed to save the life of a pregnant woman.

Resolution
The Irish government convened an expert group to address the implications of the judgement. The expert group reported to the Department of Health the night before news of the Death of Savita Halappanavar broke.

In 2013, Ireland passed the Protection of Life During Pregnancy Act which the Committee of Ministers of the Council of Europe found closed the case.

See also
 European Convention on Human Rights
 Article 8 of the European Convention on Human Rights
 Roe v Wade 
 Protection of Life During Pregnancy Act 2013
 Sheila Hodgers
 Eighth Amendment of the Constitution of Ireland
 Abortion in the Republic of Ireland
 Death of Savita Halappanavar
 Attorney General v. X
 D v Ireland
 PP v. HSE

References

External links

Documents
 ECtHR Judgment (full text)
 ECtHR Press release, 16.12.2010
 Joint Amicus Curiae Brief by the Center for Reproductive Rights and the International Sexual and Reproductive Health Law Programme
 Joint Amicus Curiae Brief by the European Center for Law and Justice, the Family Research Council and the Society for the Protection of Unborn Children

Commentaries
 Department of the Taoiseach, "Government Press Statement Re: Judgment of the European Court of Human Rights delivered this morning in the case of A, B and C v Ireland", 16 December 2010
 Center for Reproductive Rights, "European Court of Human Rights Rules that Ireland Abortion Ban Violates Human Rights, But Doesn't Go Far Enough", Press release 16 December 2010
 European Center for Law and Justice, "A. B. C. Irish abortion case: No human right to abortion under the Convention, says the European Court of Human Rights", Press release 16 December 2010
 Society for the Protection of Unborn Children, "Ireland must reject European court’s abortion judgment, says intervener SPUC", Press Release 16 December 2010
 J. C. von Krempach, "A Comment on A, B and C vs Ireland", turtlebayandbeyond.org
 P. Ronchi, "A, B and C v Ireland: Europe’s Roe v Wade still has to wait?", Law Quarterly Review, 2011, 127(Jul), 365–369 

Republic of Ireland abortion case law
Article 2 of the European Convention on Human Rights
Article 8 of the European Convention on Human Rights
European Court of Human Rights cases involving Ireland
2010 in the Republic of Ireland